The 1978 All-Ireland Senior Football Championship was the 92nd staging of the All-Ireland Senior Football Championship, the Gaelic Athletic Association's premier inter-county Gaelic football tournament. The championship began on 7 May 1978 and ended on 24 September 1978.

Dublin entered the championship as the defending champions.

On 24 September 1978, Kerry won the championship following a 5-11 to 0-9 defeat of Dublin in the All-Ireland final. This was their 24th All-Ireland title and their first in three championship seasons.

Kerry's Pat Spillane was the choice for Texaco Footballer of the Year. Dublin's Jimmy Keaveney was the championship's top scorer with 2-31.

Leinster Championship format change

In 1978 Round 2 returns to the Leinster football championship.

Results

Connacht Senior Football Championship

Quarter-finals

Semi-finals

Final

Leinster Senior Football Championship

First round

Second round

Quarter-finals

Semi-finals

Final

Munster Senior Football Championship

Quarter-finals

   

Semi-finals

Final

Ulster Senior Football Championship

Preliminary round

Quarter-finals

Semi-finals

Final

All-Ireland Senior Football Championship

Semi-finals

Final

Championship statistics

Top scorers

Overall

Miscellaneous

 Kevin Moran, who had signed for Manchester United F.C. in February 1978, was given permission from the club to line out for Dublin in their Leinster semi-final defeat of Offaly. He remained on the panel for all of Dublin's subsequent games.
 On 28 May 1978, James Stephens Park, Ballina hosted its first championship game for 28 years it was the Connacht Quarter-final between Mayo and Leitrim.
 At the Ulster final between Down and Cavan, an official attendance of 27,600 is given, however, it is estimated that between 6,000 and 8,000 extra spectators were at the game.
 In the All-Ireland semi-final between Down and Dublin, the Down players wore black armbands as a mark of respect to the late Michael Cunningham. He was the father of the team's centre-forward Mickey Cunningham and died in the week leading up to the match.
 Kerry won their first title in a year ending with 8. They became the first county in either code to win at least one All Ireland in years ending with all ten digits.

References